Johannes Meynen (13 April 1901, Winsum, Friesland – 13 February 1980, Velp) was a Dutch politician. He was a member of the Steering Committee of the Bilderberg Group.

See also
List of Dutch politicians

References

1901 births
1980 deaths
Members of the Steering Committee of the Bilderberg Group
Ministers of War of the Netherlands
Anti-Revolutionary Party politicians
Reformed Churches Christians from the Netherlands
Dutch people of World War II
People from Littenseradiel
Vrije Universiteit Amsterdam alumni